The 35th edition of the World Allround Speed Skating Championships for Women took place on 23 and 24 February in Heerenveen at the Thialf ice rink.

Title holder was the Netherlander Atje Keulen-Deelstra.

Distance medalists

Classification

 * = Fall

Source:

Attribution
In Dutch

References

1974 World Women's Allround
1974 in women's speed skating
1974 in Dutch sport
International speed skating competitions hosted by the Netherlands
World Women's Allround
February 1974 sports events in Europe
1974 in Dutch women's sport